The Twenty-Second Wisconsin Legislature convened from  to  in regular session.

Senators representing odd-numbered districts were newly elected for this session and were serving the first year of a two-year term. Assembly members were elected to a one-year term. Assembly members and odd-numbered senators were elected in the general election of November 3, 1868. Senators representing even-numbered districts were serving the second year of their two-year term, having been elected in the general election held on November 5, 1867.

Major events
 January 27, 1869: Matthew H. Carpenter was elected United States Senator by the Wisconsin Legislature in Joint Session.
 March 4, 1869: Inauguration of Ulysses S. Grant as 18th President of the United States
 May 15, 1869: The National Woman Suffrage Association was founded in New York.

Major legislation
 March 9, 1869: Joint Resolution ratifying the proposed amendment to the constitution of the United States, 1869 Joint Resolution 6.  
 March 9, 1869: Joint Resolution proposing an amendment to the constitution of the state so as to authorize the abolishment of the grand jury system, 1869 Joint Resolution 7.  This amendment was ratified at the November 1870 general election.
 March 10, 1869: An Act to codify the laws of this state relating to highways and bridges, 1869 Act 152
 March 11, 1869: Joint Resolution proposing amendment to section 4 article 7 of the constitution, 1869 Joint Resolution 8.  Proposed expanding the Wisconsin Supreme Court from three to five justices.  This amendment was rejected by voters in November 1872, but the court expansion was successful on a subsequent attempt in 1878.

Party summary

Senate summary

Assembly summary

Sessions
 1st Regular session: January 13, 1869March 11, 1869

Leaders

Senate leadership
 President of the Senate: Wyman Spooner (R)
 President pro tempore: George C. Hazelton (R)

Assembly leadership
 Speaker of the Assembly: Alexander M. Thomson (R)

Members

Members of the Senate
Members of the Wisconsin Senate for the Twenty-Second Wisconsin Legislature:

Members of the Assembly
Members of the Assembly for the Twenty-Second Wisconsin Legislature:

Employees

Senate employees
 Chief Clerk: L. B. Hills
 Assistant Clerk: John S. Wilson
 Bookkeeper: H. H. Rust
 Engrossing Clerk: J. H. Culvor
 Enrolling Clerk: W. T. Brayton
 Transcribing Clerk: E. M. Truell
 Sergeant-at-Arms: W. H. Hamilton
 Assistant Sergeant-at-Arms: Franklin Kelly
 Postmaster: T. L. Terry
 Assistant Postmaster: George Pietssch
 Doorkeeper: John McGill
 Assistant Doorkeeper: P. C. Selden
 Assistant Doorkeeper: J. K. Parish
 Assistant Doorkeeper: Mark Shepard
 Gallery Doorkeeper: Henry Taylor
 Night Watch: E. C. Arnold
 Porter & Mess: Martin Mulville
 Messengers:
 Robert B. McCord
 Charlie S. Vedder
 George Webster
 V. Wilson
 William Gleason
 Edward Knight

Assembly employees
 Chief Clerk: Ephraim W. Young
 Assistant Clerk: William M. Newcomb
 Bookkeeper: Fred A. Dennett
 Engrossing Clerk: A. H. Reed
 Enrolling Clerk: E. H. Webb
 Transcribing Clerk: E. C. Clark
 Sergeant-at-Arms: R. C. Kelly
 1st Assistant Sergeant-at-Arms: Sam Fifield
 2nd Assistant Sergeant-at-Arms: E. A. Gibbons
 Postmaster: C. F. Solberg
 1st Assistant Postmaster: Sam Bartholomew
 2nd Assistant Postmaster: H. C. Warner
 Doorkeepers: 
 A. McLaughlin
 T. H. Grist
 J. Dickinson
 H. Seffens
 Night Watch: James Roberts
 Firemen:
 J. Warren
 Samuel Bachman
 Speaker's Messenger: Parke I. Graves
 Chief Clerk's Messenger: Frank R. Norton
 Messengers:
 Thomas McDonald
 Charles H. Newton
 Henry A. Douglass
 Emile Hammer
 George Aiken
 Howley Baxter
 C. Bingham
 G. F. Hibbard
 Dan Fitzpatrick
 Gallery Attendants:
 William Woolnough
 W. P. Borroughs

References

External links

1869 in Wisconsin
Wisconsin
Wisconsin legislative sessions